Sudbury Valley Trustees (SVT) is a regional open space land trust headquartered at Wolbach Farm in Sudbury, Massachusetts.

Mission 
The SVT mission is to conserve land and protect wildlife habitat in the Concord, Assabet, and Sudbury river watersheds in eastern Massachusetts, one of the most scenic, culturally rich, and historically significant regions in the United States, for the benefit of present and future generations.

About SVT 
SVT pursues its mission through land acquisition, land stewardship, advocacy, and education. SVT achieves its land protection objectives by working in close collaboration with landowners, businesses, local conservation commissions and government agencies. The work is performed by an active, community-based 17 member Board, a staff of 8, and 150 volunteers.

The land acquisition objective emphasizes (1) protection of ecologically significant resources within SVT’s service area, with emphasis on priority areas, (2) protection of land possessing significant community and historic value (“flagship properties”), (3) increased acquisition of fee-simple properties, (4) increased receipt of gifts of interest in land, and (5) enhanced SVT land protection and outreach efforts. 

The stewardship objective emphasizes (1) increased opportunities for positive nature-based experiences on SVT reservations, (2) implementation of best management practices for conservation restriction and fee properties, and (3) demonstrated best practices for conservation of regional biodiversity.

As of 2008, over 3,600 members supported SVT’s work in 36 different towns in the watershed. SVT has taken a significant leadership role that has been instrumental in preserving an additional  now under the permanent protection of public agencies, including the Great Meadows National Wildlife Refuge. As of its annual meeting on September 28, 2008, SVT was nearing completion of the acquisition from the Knox Trail Council Boy Scouts of America of the development rights for the   comprising the Nobscot Scout Reservation.

SVT celebrated its 50th anniversary year in 2005, which culminated in its 50th annual meeting and birthday party on May 22, 2005 at Wolbach Farm in Sudbury. SVT reservations include trails for walking, bird watching, cross-country skiing and horseback riding. Those properties are open to the public free of charge.

History 
SVT was founded in 1953. Upon returning to Wayland, Massachusetts after serving in the Marine Corps during World War II and the Korean War, Allen Morgan saw that the land he remembered being forest and farm as a child was rapidly being turned into homes and shopping malls. Realizing that the open spaces would be lost forever unless action was taken, he gathered together six friends (B. Allen Benjamin, Dr. George K. Lewis, Henry Parker, Willis B. Ryder, Richard Stackpole, and Roger P. Stokey) and founded Sudbury Valley Trustees to protect the natural resources of the area "on the theory that if we sat back and did nothing, certainly nothing would happen, and if we tried, maybe something would happen."

They mailed a form letter inviting people to become members for a fee of $3.00. SVT grew to a couple hundred members within a year or two. SVT publications emphasizing the importance of flood plain marshes led to the first flood plain zoning in the northeast. Thanks to SVT advocacy, most of the towns in the Sudbury Valley had established flood plain zones that protected upwards of  without having to spend dollars to acquire them.

SVT was an organization run purely through the efforts of volunteers until Morgan became SVT's first Executive Director in 1981.

References 

 Sudbury Valley Trustees Spring Newsletter, May, 1990
 Metrowest News Weekly, June 9, 1989

External links
Sudbury Valley Trustees website (Sudbury, Massachusetts)
The Land Trust Alliance website
Nobscot Scout Reservation website

Land trusts in Massachusetts
Sudbury, Massachusetts